Cynariops is an extinct genus of gorgonopsian that lived in what is now South Africa during the Permian. The holotype skull specimen MB.R.999 was made the basis of the new genus and species Cynariops robustus by Robert Broom in 1925, but the genus was later synonymised with other genera. It was catalogued as a specimen of Aelurognathus at Museum für Naturkunde, Berlin, until it was further prepared and described in 2018, and the genus Cynariops resurrected.

References

Gorgonopsia
Prehistoric therapsid genera
Taxa named by Robert Broom